Manchester Township is a civil township in Cumberland County, North Carolina. The population was 24,643 at the 2010 census.

References

Townships in Cumberland County, North Carolina